Patrick Plisson (born May 10, 1952 in Orléans) is a former Grand Prix motorcycle road racer from France. His best years were in 1978 and 1979 when he finished in third place in the 50cc world championship.

References 

1952 births
French motorcycle racers
50cc World Championship riders
125cc World Championship riders
Living people
Sportspeople from Orléans